David Alan Basche (born August 25, 1968) is an American actor. He is best known for playing Todd Beamer in the film United 93, directed by Paul Greengrass. He has been a series regular on many TV comedies and dramas, and has also appeared in films directed by Steven Spielberg, Martin Scorsese, Paul Greengrass, Shawn Levy, Robert Zemeckis, and Michael Patrick King.

Life and career
Basche was born in Hartford, Connecticut. His first acting role was in a school production of The Adventures of Tom Sawyer when he was in the sixth grade at West Hartford's Norfeldt Elementary School. Basche, who describes his demeanor then as an "angry, smart-ass kid," tried out for and landed the lead role after a school counselor suggested he take up acting to channel some of his anger and emotion. Basche appeared in several plays presented by the Greater Hartford Jewish Community Center while he was a student at King Philip Middle School, and he had roles in 10 school plays during his four years at William H. Hall High School in West Hartford. Basche then went on to Emerson College, starting out as a communications major before switching to performing arts.

His first major exposure was starring in Oh Grow Up, a short-lived sitcom created by Alan Ball. He later played the role of Steven Keats for two seasons in the NBC sitcom Three Sisters. He appeared in the 2005 film War of the Worlds in the role of Tim, the stepfather of Dakota Fanning and Justin Chatwin's characters. In 2006 he played Todd Beamer in United 93. David landed the lead role in 2007's I'll Believe You, a family-friendly sci-fi comedy. In 2008 he portrayed Mike Harness in Lipstick Jungle on NBC for two seasons, while simultaneously playing the role of Kenny Kagan on The Starter Wife on USA Network. In 2010 he guest starred on Law & Order: Special Victims Unit, White Collar, Law & Order: Criminal Intent and The Mentalist. Basche also appeared in the film Sex and the City 2 as a wedding guest, and had a small role in the 2017 mystery film The Vanishing of Sidney Hall.

Basche starred for four seasons in the TV Land original series The Exes, which premiered on November 30, 2011. The series ended on September 16, 2015.

Personal life
Basche is married to the actress Alysia Reiner; they met during a summer stock production of William Shakespeare's Twelfth Night. The couple has a daughter, Livia Charles Basche, born December 5, 2008.

Basche has a tattoo on his left wrist that says "There Is No Perfect."

Professional credits

New York Theater

Regional theater

Filmography

Television series

References

External links

Official Website of David Alan Basche
 High School Yearbook Photograph of David Basche

American male film actors
American male stage actors
American male television actors
Male actors from Hartford, Connecticut
Jewish American male actors
People from West Hartford, Connecticut
1968 births
Living people
20th-century American male actors
21st-century American male actors
Hall High School (Connecticut) alumni
21st-century American Jews